Mater Dei Catholic (MDCHS) is a private, Roman Catholic TK-12 school in Chula Vista, California, United States. It is located in the Roman Catholic Diocese of San Diego. 

In 1960, Bishop Charles F. Buddy founded the first co-educational Catholic high school in the Diocese of San Diego. It would be built on twenty acres of land donated by Mr. and Mrs. Robert Egger. Seventy young students and a faculty of four embarked on a lasting venture which was to become known as Marian High School. These boys and girls carried the hopes and best wishes of many people as they attended classes in a three­ room division of St. Charles School across the street from what would be the future campus. In 2002, the Diocese of San Diego decided to upgrade all of its secondary campuses. A new site in Chula Vista was chosen and a new school was built. In 2007, the name was changed from Marian Catholic High School to Mater Dei Catholic and the school moved to its present location.

The original campus was located in South San Diego, near the intersection of Coronado Avenue and Thermal Street. Across from Marian Catholic was the parochial K-8 school, Saint Charles Catholic School. The new campus is located in East Chula Vista, in close proximity to Otay Ranch Town Center. Its facilities include the Marian chapel, a track and football stadium, baseball and softball diamonds, tennis courts, full-service 800-seat theater, competition swimming pool, basketball/volleyball gym, environmentally friendly "earth bench".

Mater Dei Catholic also sponsors Juan Diego Adult Center, which offers free English and citizenship classes, educational opportunities for personal development which empowers people to reach their full potential in regards to employment and participation in civic, community and parish affairs.

Athletics 
Most recently, the Mater Dei football team won the CIF Division 5AA State Championship in December 2015 against Immanuel High School of Reedley, CA.

Basketball
The 2009 Lady Crusaders became the first Crusader team to win a state title.

Notable alumni 
 Paul Arriola Professional Soccer player, member of the United States men's national soccer team and current player of D.C. United in MLS.
 Stanley Daniels NFL player
 John Carlos Frey (1981), activist, screenwriter, film director and actor.
 Alejandro Guido Professional Soccer player, current player of Club Tijuana in Liga MX.
 José Martínez (2011) International volleyball player, member of Mexico men's national volleyball team.
 George Milke. Former Major League baseball pitcher for the New York Mets
 Jason Myers NFL Pro-Bowler
 Mickey Pimentel (2003) American football linebacker for the Atlanta Falcons of the National Football League.
 Mary Salas (1966). Former California State Assembly member, 79th District
 C. J. Verdell Oregon Ducks running back.

References

External links
 
 Wikimapia view

Catholic secondary schools in California
Educational institutions established in 1960
High schools in San Diego County, California
Education in Chula Vista, California
1960 establishments in California